Quentin Delapierre (born 17 July 1992) is a French sailor. He competed in the Nacra 17 event at the 2020 Summer Olympics. At the 2021–22 SailGP championship, he replaced Billy Besson as the helm of the French SailGP team.

References

External links
 

1992 births
Living people
French male sailors (sport)
Olympic sailors of France
Sailors at the 2020 Summer Olympics – Nacra 17
Sportspeople from Vannes
21st-century French people